The 2021 Mississippi College Choctaws football team represented Mississippi College as a member of the Gulf South Conference (GSC) during the 2021 NCAA Division II football season. They were led by eighth-year head coach John Bland. The Choctaws played their home games at Robinson-Hale Stadium in Clinton, Mississippi.

Previous season
The Choctaws finished the 2020 season 0–1. On August 12, 2020, Gulf South Conference postponed fall competition in 2020 for several sports due to the COVID-19 pandemic. A few months later in November, the conference announced that there will be no spring conference competition in football. Teams that opt-in to compete would have to schedule on their own. The Choctaws only scheduled one official game against Tarleton State in spring 2021 for the 2020 season.

Schedule
Mississippi College announced their 2021 football schedule on August 3, 2021.

Notes
1. Mississippi College's game against West Alabama on November 13, 2021, is a non-conference game despite both teams being GSC members.

References

Mississippi College
Mississippi College Choctaws football seasons
Mississippi College Choctaws football